The Colour of Magic is a text adventure game developed by Delta 4 and published by Piranha Software, released in 1986. It was released for the ZX Spectrum, Amstrad CPC, and Commodore 64 computers. It is the first Discworld computer game and so far the only one adapted directly from one of the novels, and follows the plot of the book closely.

In 2006, another video game based on The Colour of Magic was released on mobile phones titled Discworld: The Colour of Magic. It is an isometric action game.

References

External links
 
 

1980s interactive fiction
Interactive fiction based on works
1986 video games
Adventure games
Amstrad CPC games
Commodore 64 games
Video games based on Discworld
Video games developed in the United Kingdom
Video games set on fictional planets
ZX Spectrum games